Marian Cosmin Obedeanu (born 11 December 2000) is a Romanian professional footballer who plays as a midfielder for Liga II side Unirea Constanța. He made his debut in Liga I on 2 June 2019, in a match between Gaz Metan Mediaș and Concordia Chiajna, ended with the score of 3-1.

References

External links
 
 

2000 births
Living people
Footballers from Bucharest
Romanian footballers
Association football midfielders
Liga I players
Liga II players
CS Concordia Chiajna players
LPS HD Clinceni players
FC Botoșani players
AFC Progresul Spartac București players